The 2020 United States presidential election in Wyoming was held on Tuesday, November 3, 2020, as part of the 2020 United States presidential election in which all 50 states and the District of Columbia participated. Wyoming voters chose electors to represent them in the Electoral College via a popular vote, pitting the Republican Party's nominee, incumbent President Donald Trump and running mate Vice President Mike Pence, against Democratic Party nominee, former Vice President Joe Biden and his running mate California Senator Kamala Harris. Wyoming has three electoral votes in the Electoral College. Trump, the Republican nominee and incumbent president of the United States, won the state's three electoral votes.

Trump routed Biden in Wyoming, with his 69.94% vote share there making it his strongest win in the election. He won the sparsely populated state by a margin of 43.39%, down from his 45.77% four years earlier. Prior to the election, all news organizations declared Wyoming a safe red state, therefore justifying its status as one of the safest red states in the country, not being won by a Democrat since Lyndon B. Johnson's 1964 landslide victory. Trump's 69.94% of the vote is the second-highest ever by a presidential candidate in Wyoming, only surpassed by Ronald Reagan during his 1984 landslide.

Despite his loss, Biden scored a landslide win in Teton County, garnering a larger vote share in it than any nominee since 1984. He also narrowly flipped the bellwether of Albany County, anchored by the college town of Laramie, which had supported Obama in 2008 before returning to the Republican Party in 2012 and 2016, albeit by a narrow margin. Per exit polls by the Associated Press, Trump's strength in Wyoming came from whites, who comprised 89% of the electorate, and from voters prioritizing energy policy, with 62% believing the government should focus on expanding production of fossil fuels such as oil, gas, or coal.

Caucuses

Democratic caucuses

The Democratic caucuses were originally scheduled for April 4, 2020. On March 22, due to concerns over the COVID-19 pandemic, the Wyoming Democratic Party canceled in-person voting in favor of mail-in voting. The deadline was also extended to April 17.

Republican caucuses
The Republican state party convention was held in May to officially select the final delegates to the national convention.

Libertarian nominee
Jo Jorgensen, Psychology Senior Lecturer at Clemson University

General election

Predictions

Polling

Graphical summary

Aggregate polls

Polls
Polls with a sample size of <100 have their sample size entries marked in red to indicate a lack of reliability.

Electoral slates
These slates of electors were nominated by each party in order to vote in the Electoral College should their candidate win the state:

Results

By county

Counties that flipped from Republican to Democratic
 Albany (largest municipality: Laramie)

By congressional district
Due to the state's low population, only one congressional district is allocated. This district is called the At-Large district, because it covers the entire state, and thus is equivalent to the statewide election results.

See also
 United States presidential elections in Wyoming
 Presidency of Joe Biden
 2020 United States presidential election
 2020 Democratic Party presidential primaries
 2020 Libertarian Party presidential primaries
 2020 Republican Party presidential primaries
 2020 United States elections

Notes

References

External links
 
 
  (State affiliate of the U.S. League of Women Voters)
 

Wyoming
Presidential
2020